Jonathan Savoie is a Tokyo-based commercial and editorial photographer who specializes in a travel photography, minimalist architecture and urban landscapes.  He is known for his use of vibrant colors combined with detailed and often complex subject matter to create photographs that demand acute attention to detail.  His work has appeared in Condé Nast Traveler, Frame, Interior Design, Casa Brutus, GQ Italy, and Casa Vogue.

Life and work

Raised in Canada, Savoie moved to Europe to study art and design before relocating permanently to Tokyo in 2003 to pursue a career in photography. Soon after moving to Tokyo Savoie fully immersed himself in the city’s skateboarding scene and eventually befriended the Editor-in-Chief of Transworld Skateboarding Japan, who invited him to shoot a feature for the magazine.  For the next few years Savoie became a steady contributor to Transworld Skateboarding, Warp, Surfing Life, and the arts and culture magazine Tokion.

Savoie signed with AVGVST, one of Tokyo’s leading creative management agencies, in 2004 and started to focus on fashion and commercial photography.  The same year, Sony and Konami hired Savoie to photograph the key artwork for the worldwide release of their video game Metal Gear Solid 3.

In 2005 Savoie began working on a project entitled "Tokyo Privé" that was later published as a book in 2007. It is an album of snapshot photographs taken by Savoie with a point-and-shoot camera that are meant to "…capture those odd moments of beauty that are always around us but usually fleeting." "Tokyo Privé" acts as Savoie’s visual diary of Tokyo, and he states that it is "not a true reflection of how the city really is but simply as I remember it."

In 2006 Savoie continued to further his commercial work receiving commissions from MUFG bank, Japan Airlines, Universal Records and Uslu Airlines.  The same year he left AVGVST and then signed with the international agency, GA and with their encouragement he started to focus on modern architecture and urban landscapes.

Personal life
Savoie currently resides with his two children in Tokyo, Japan.

Exhibitions

Blister in the Sun,  Gallery NeuBacher. Toronto 2003 
Absence of Luxury, SPIN Gallery. Toronto 2004 
Conception, Suite 16 Gallery. Tokyo 2006 
Paysages affectifs, Galerie Youn. Montreal 2013

Publications
Tokyo Privé 2007

References

External links
 Official Website
 Artsy
 Instagram
 Pinx Agency

Canadian photographers
Canadian photojournalists
Architectural photographers
Living people
People from Halifax, Nova Scotia
Year of birth missing (living people)